Garbh Eilean is a forested island in Loch Maree, Wester Ross, Scotland.

Garbh Eilean lies between Eilean Sùbhainn and Eilean Ruairidh Mòr. The islands are among the least disturbed in Britain. They are managed as the Loch Maree National Nature Reserve by agreements between Scottish Natural Heritage and their owners.

Footnotes

Islands of Loch Maree
Uninhabited islands of Highland (council area)